The Africa Super League will be an annual continental club football competition run by the CAF that is set to kickoff in August 2023. It was announced on 28 November 2019 by Gianni Infantino, President of FIFA. It was launched on 10 August 2022 in Tanzania, and will include twenty-four elite African clubs with a promotion/relegation system.

The essence of holding this tournament is the huge financial returns, projected to exceed $100 million, to be used to develop and improve stadiums, infrastructure and the promotion of African football.

History 
Gianni Infantino launched the tournament during a visit to the Democratic Republic of the Congo to celebrate the 80th anniversary of TP Mazembe, saying the top 20 clubs in Africa should be chosen and made to participate in an African league. Infantino said this league would generate revenues of $ 100 million, making it among the top ten leagues in the world, and revealed that he was launching an appeal to raise $1 billion in order to give every African country a football stadium that complies with the specifications of FIFA.

In 17 July 2021, the President of CAF, Patrice Motsepe, confirmed the move to implement the African Super League project as a new tournament ran under the umbrella of CAF, with large financial returns for the sides taking part. The Confederation of African Football launched the competition on 10 August 2022 in Arusha, Tanzania, where more information about the competition was released.

CAF wants to start the competition in August 2023 and reports suggest that 24 clubs will feature in three groups of eight teams, ahead of a knockout stage starting at the Round of 16. 

These teams will be taken from the best-ranked African clubs over the past few years, with groups to be played on a regional basis (North, Central/West, South/East). As part of the club licensing criteria, participating clubs will be required to have a youth academy and a women’s team.

Format 
Details of the format were announced during the launch ceremony:

 The competition will have 24 teams divided into three regionalized groups (North, Central/West, South/East), for eight teams per group, and there will be a maximum of three teams per country.
 The teams will be from 16 countries, representing approximately 1 billion people.
 The competition will have 197 matches (with a maximum of 21 matches played by the finalists) and promotion/relegation play-offs.
 The final will be played in a single match, with the final designed to become "the Super Bowl of Africa".

Money distribution 
The total prizemoney for the Africa Super League will be US$100 million, with the winner receiving US$11.5 million, and each participating club receiving an initial cash injection of US$2.5 million. Some of the funding from the Africa Super League will be used to allocate US$1 million per annum to each of CAF’s 54 member countries, for a total investment of US$54 million per annum to develop football in Africa.

CAF will also receive US$50 million per annum to develop football for boys and girls, employ world-class staff, as well as to improve and to make all its other competitions attractive and appealing to football spectators, TV viewers, sponsors and other partners. 

The Africa Super League will also support the growth of club football, the construction and maintenance of football infrastructure and facilities, and the training and the retention of football talent in Africa.

Controversies 
The project has been subjected to criticism for unrealistic expectations of financial returns. The current continental championships in Africa experience weak infrastructure and high travel costs for fans and teams, which will not be automatically resolved by this new competition. 

There are already significant financial disputes between the major teams in North Africa, South Africa and the rest of the continent, which would be exacerbated by the new competition. Further, it is also doubtful whether the competition can arouse the public's attention, despite claims to the contrary, while there are concerns about the impact of the new competition on the current Confederation of African Football Championships such as the CAF Champions League, the CAF Confederation Cup and national leagues.

In this regard, the Confederation of African Football has also been described as a laboratory of experiments, with the acceptance of the proposal to establish the African Super League contrasting with the rejection of the European Super League by UEFA in April 2021.

See also 
 CAF Champions League
 CAF Confederation Cup
 European Super League, a proposed tournament with similar format for clubs from Europe

References 

Super Cup